Daniel Scheinhardt (born 25 October 1970) is a German former professional footballer who played as a defender.

External links
 

1970 births
Living people
Footballers from Berlin
German footballers
Association football defenders
Bundesliga players
2. Bundesliga players
Hertha BSC players
VfL Osnabrück players
Alemannia Aachen players
Rot-Weiß Oberhausen players
FC St. Pauli players
Tennis Borussia Berlin players
Berliner AK 07 players
Torgelower FC Greif players